Huggan is a surname. Notable people with the surname include:

Isabel Huggan (born 1943), Canadian author of fiction and personal essays
James Huggan (1888–1914), Scotland rugby union player

See also
Huggen